Phyllonorycter cocciferella is a moth of the family Gracillariidae. It is known from southern France and the Iberian Peninsula.

The larvae feed on Quercus coccifera. They mine the leaves of their host plant. They create a lower-surface tentiform mine.

References

cocciferella
Moths of Europe
Moths described in 1910